Nice View is an album by saxophonist Tim Berne's Caos Totale which was recorded in 1993 and released on the JMT label.

Reception
The AllMusic review by Brian Olewnick states "In many ways, Berne seems to pick up on groundwork laid by his teacher, the great composer/saxophonist Julius Hemphill, and takes things to the next stage, walking the fine line between deep composition and inspired improvisation. One of Berne's best efforts".

Track listing
All compositions by Tim Berne
 "It Could Have Been a Lot Worse" - 21:15   
 "The Third Rail" - 17:32   
 "Impacted Wisdom" - 38:03

Personnel
Tim Berne - alto saxophone
Herb Robertson - trumpet
Steve Swell - trombone
Django Bates - peck horn, keyboards, piano, confusion
Marc Ducret - guitars, shades
Mark Dresser - contrabass
Bobby Previte - drums

References 

1994 albums
Tim Berne albums
JMT Records albums
Winter & Winter Records albums